Flavivirga amylovorans is a Gram-negative, strictly aerobic and rod-shaped bacterium from the genus of Flavivirga which has been isolated from seawater from the Jeju Island.

References 

Flavobacteria
Bacteria described in 2012